

Gangster Disciples in the military
Gangster Disciples have been documented in the U.S. military, found in both U.S. and overseas bases. Graffiti characteristics of the Gangster Disciples have reportedly been spotted in U.S. military bases in both Iraq and Afghanistan.

Symbols, Signs, and Emblems
Like most major gangs, Gangster Disciples use a well-defined system of symbols to communicate alliances and rivalries. This system is a combination of symbols that represent the Gangster Disciple Nation or the Folk Nation as a whole and symbols that rivals use to represent their organization, typically inverted to show disrespect.

References

Organizations established in the 1990s
1990s establishments in Illinois
African-American gangs
Folk Nation
Gangs in Chicago
African-American history in Chicago